The 2015 Larry H. Miller Tour of Utah is the twelfth edition of the Tour of Utah. It starts on August 3 in Logan and finishes on August 9 in Park City. It is rated as a 2.HC event on the UCI America Tour.

Teams
The fifteen teams invited to participate in the Tour of Utah are:

Stages

Classification leadership

Final classification

References

External links

2015
2015 in men's road cycling
2015 in American sports
2015 in sports in Utah
August 2015 sports events in the United States